Diospyros ridleyi is a tree in the family Ebenaceae. Twigs are reddish brown when young. Inflorescences bear up to three flowers. The tree is named for the English botanist Henry Nicholas Ridley. Habitat is mainly lowland mixed dipterocarp forests. D. ridleyi is found in India, Peninsular Malaysia and Borneo.

References

ridleyi
Plants described in 1933
Flora of India (region)
Flora of the Andaman Islands
Flora of the Nicobar Islands
Trees of Peninsular Malaysia
Trees of Borneo